Nazira (IPA: nəˈzɪərə) is a town and a municipal board in Sivasagar district in the Indian state of Assam.

Nazira is a historical town on the bank of the Dikhow River. It is around 18 km from Sivasagar city, 3 km from Simaluguri Jn. and 78 km from Jorhat Airport. It is the Sub-divisional Head Office of Nazira Sub-division.

History 

Nazira was an important place in the Ahom Kingdom. Nearby Gargaon was the capital of the kingdom over a long period. According to tradition Nazira got its name from "Now-Jeera", which in Assamese means resting place of boats. The historian Sarbananda Rajkumar states, however, that nazira is a Tai Ahom word: na means "land", zi "inclined" and ra "much". Therefore nazira means a "much inclined land". He also writes that once the important places of Nazira were Ganak Village and Nazirahat.

Being in the vicinity of the Dikhow River and the capital of Ahom kingdom Gargaon, it is said that boats used to rest in this place after their long journey through the river. The Kareng Ghar a palace from the Medieval period build by King Rajeshwar Singha, a ruler of the Ahom kingdom stands as a testimony of the bygone era. During the British rule, tea plantations were started in and around Nazira like the other parts of upper Assam. The present day officer's club of Oil and Natural Gas Corporation limited (ONGCL) was in fact a tea planter's club established in 1939. Nazira was the headquarters of famous Assam Tea Company. An account of Life in and around Nazira during the 1940s to 1960s by European tea planters can be found here.

John White Masters, as Superintendent of the Assam Company went to Assam in June 1839 and took up residence at Nazira. He made it the company's headquarters. An old British graveyard lies inside ONGC Colony in Nazira town. Here there are about 62 graves that can be traced according to the list given by H. A. Antrobus. The buried include the historian William Robinson, the author of A Grammar of Assamese Language (1839) and A Descriptive Account Of Assam: With a Sketch of the Local Geography, and a Concise History of the Tea-Plant of Assam. (1841).

William Robinson mastered the Mising language, and the Dafla language too: he wrote Notes on the Daflas and the Peculiarities of Their Language. He made the first attempt at a grammar of the Mising language for institutional use, with his A short outline of Miri (Mising) grammar  published in the March issue of Journal of the Asiatic Society of Bengal, in 1849. (Vol, 18, part 1, page 224).
 
The Gorokihiya Temple, at Namati of Ahom days is 3 km from Nazira. History says that Ahom King Pratap Singha (1603–41) was a devotee of God Siva before he took his throne and he worshipped a Siva Linga. After he got his throne as a King he removed the Siva Linga and established it on the bank of Dikhow River just opposite to Gargaon in a temple which was called as Maidol. This temple is also known as Maheswara Ghar or house or God Siva. Charaideu is just 16 km from Nazira Town. Here tourist can see the very sacred earthen pyramids (Tombs) of Ahom Kings, families and other ministers. During World War II (1939–1945) also Nazira had played an important rule in China Burma India Theatre. The OSS Detachment 101 established a base camp under the guise of a centre for malarial research at a tea plantation near Nazira. Detachment 101's training camp was located at Nazira (ost probably in the present Guest House, ONGCL Colony, Nazira).

Nazira has educational institutions including Gargaon College, Nazira College, Nazira Boys Higher Secondary and Multi Purpose School, Nazira Girls HS School, Nazira Bortol HS School, Kendriya Vidyalaya, Jawahar Navodaya Vidyalaya, DPS Nazira, Sankardev Vidya Niketan, St. Peters School, Ligiri Pukhuri High School, Gurukul school, Amolapatty, NEEDS Technical Institute and many more. The primary source of income of this area is employment in ONGC and Govt. Departments. Well experienced entrepreneurs are doing oilfield related contracts & services. Big companies like Halliburton and Schlumberger operate in this area. However, cultivation is still one of the main source of income of this region.

Geography 
It has an average elevation of 132 metres (433 feet).

Climate 
It has a humid subtropical monsoon climate like the rest of Assam. It has a long rainy season starting with pre-monsoon showers in the months of April, which signals the onset of spring. The real deluge starts in June, which continues up to the month of September. The rainy season, which gets overlapped with the summer season, help maintain the maximum temperature attainable to around 35 degree Celsius. The winter season starts at around November and continues up to February. The minimum temperature seldom reaches below 10 degree Celsius. Light woollen cloth is enough to beat the cold.

Demographics 
 India census, Nazira had a population of 13,304. Males constitute 53% of the population and females 47%. Nazira has an literacy rate of 92.58%, higher than the national average: male literacy is 94.94%, and female literacy is 90.03%. In Nazira, 9.62% of the population is under 6 years of age. Nazira is mainly inhabited by Ahoms followed by the Assamese Muslims, Brahmins, Koch, Kalitas, Deories Kaibarta and tea tribes constitute the rest of the portion of the demographic chart. Besides Nazira also has a sizeable population from the tea tribes community, who were brought as labours from central India by British for Tea plantations. 76.69% of population are Hindus and 22.23% are Muslims. Remaining 1.08% belong to other religions.

Villages 
Budbari Satra, Rajapool Handique Gaon, Rajapool Gohain Gaon, Rajapool Duwara Gaon, Bhabar Chuk, Chonbasa gaon, khanikar Gaon.

Politics
Nazira is part of Jorhat (Lok Sabha constituency).

List of MLA

 1946: Sanu Kheria
 1951: Ananda Chandra Bezbarua, Indian National Congress
 1957: Tankeswar Chetia, Indian National Congress
 1962: K.K. Gogoi, Indian National Congress
 1967: Hiteswar Saikia, Indian National Congress
 1972: Hiteswar Saikia, Indian National Congress
 1978: Hiteswar Saikia, Indian National Congress
 1983: Hiteswar Saikia, Indian National Congress
 1985: Hiteswar Saikia, Indian National Congress
 1988 (by polls): Tanu Konwar, Asom Gana Parishad
 1991: Hiteswar Saikia, Indian National Congress
 1996: Hemprove Saikia, Indian National Congress
 2001: Hemprove Saikia, Indian National Congress
 2006: Drupad Borgohain, Communist Party of India
 2011: Debabrata Saikia, Indian National Congress
 2016: Debabrata Saikia, Indian National Congress

Economy
Nazira lies in an oil and gas rich region. Oil and Natural Gas Corporation (ONGC is state owned entity) operates major oil rigs and production platforms for E&P exploration. Several other multinationals such as Schlumberger and Halliburton are also present in the city. ONGC has many oil fields in Assam namely Lakwa, Galeki, Rudrasagar etc and some of them are quite old and under secondary oil recovery. It has provided a good employment to the local people and there are many employees of ONGC who are from outside states and stay here either in ONGC colony or outside in rented house. ONGC has offices also in the district headquarter that is Sivasagar city and ONGC is contributing a lot to the local economy as the employees will be spending a good amount out of their salary here. Nazira local market caters to the need of these people as well as the local population. Tea and agricultural cultivations are also main source of income of common people.

The headquarters of ONGC, Assam Asset, a Maharatna E&P company is situated in Nazira. Nazira is surrounded by huge tea estates like Mackeypore, Geleky, Santok, Bihubor, Lakwa, Ligiripukhuri, Mezenga, Bamunpukhuri and Maduri Tea estate. Once Mezenga was related with Scottish Assam Tea Company; This company was formed in 1865 to purchase, extend and cultivate Heelekah, Mazenga and Karsoolie Estates in Assam. 

Nazira local website Www.Nazira.in

Educational Institute 
College
 Nazira College
 Gargaon College
Junior College
 Swaraj Academy
 Kaziranga Academy
 Siukapha Academy
 MGM Junior College
 Ved Academy
 Nazira Jr College
 Shankardev Jr College
 Brahmaputra Academy
 Aniruddha Academy
 Gyanjyoti Academy

School
 Nazira Boys High Secondary & Multi Purpose School
 Nazira Girls High Secondary School
 Delhi Public School
 Kendriya Vidyalaya
 Adarsha Vidya Bhavan
 Nazira Jatiya Vidiyalaya
 Angkuran Jatiya Vidyalaya
 Sankardev Vidya Niketan
 Gurukul school
 Shankardev Vidiya
 ST.Peter's School
 Nazira Jatiya Vidyapeeth

Institute
 Arizan Institute
 NEEDS Technical Institute
 CIC
 Neiit-A

Industry 
 Oil & Natural Gas Corporation Ltd.
 National Printing Press.

References 

Cities and towns in Sivasagar district
Sivasagar